Suthita Chanachaisuwan (born 28 January 1998), nicknamed Image, is a Thai singer. She became known from her participation in the third season of the singing competition The Voice Thailand in 2014, where she finished as first runner-up.

Biography
Suthita auditioned for The Voice at the age of 16, when she was studying at Samsenwittayalai School. She competed under the team of Coach Stamp (Apiwat Eurthavornsuk), of whom she was a fan, and finished as first runner-up. She has since become one of the show's better-known contestants. Following the show's conclusion, she made covers of several popular songs, collaborated with Apiwat as well as other artists, and appeared as guest singer in several concerts. She wrote and released her first single, "Not a Goodbye" (an English-language song), in 2017, and recorded "Mong Chan Tee" (Look at Me), the theme song to the film Bad Genius, the same year. She is  currently studying economics at Thammasat University.

Filmography

Film

Television
 2017 Songkram Pleng (2017) (Gun Pakdeevijit/3SD28) as Asara Kittithanyapat (Ays)
 2021 The Messenger (Anda99/PPTVHD36) as Da With Chinawut Indracusin

Series

MC

Television 
 20 : On Air

Online 
 20 : On Air YouTube:

References

Suthita Chanachaisuwan
The Voice (franchise) contestants
1998 births
Living people